Louis Sainte-Marie (April 30, 1835 – March 12, 1913) was a Quebec merchant and political figure. He represented Napierville in the House of Commons of Canada from 1887 to 1890 as a Liberal member and Napierville in the Legislative Assembly of Quebec from 1890 to 1897 as a Liberal and then Conservative member.

He was born in St-Constant, Lower Canada, the son of Louis Sainte-Marie and Rose Dupuis. Saint-Marie was educated at Beauharnois and entered business as a merchant at Saint-Rémi. He was a captain in the militia, serving during the Fenian raids. In 1861, he married Précille Caron. Sainte-Marie served on the town council for Saint-Rémi and was mayor from 1877 to 1882. In 1890, he resigned his seat in the House of Commons and was elected to the Quebec assembly as a Liberal. He was elected as a Conservative in 1892; Sainte-Marie was defeated when he ran for reelection in 1897. He died in Saint-Rémi at the age of 80.

References 
 
 

1835 births
1913 deaths
Members of the House of Commons of Canada from Quebec
Conservative Party of Canada (1867–1942) MPs
Conservative Party of Quebec MNAs
Quebec Liberal Party MNAs
Mayors of places in Quebec
People from Saint-Constant, Quebec